Gaboš is a village in Vukovar-Syrmia County, Croatia, population 516. The settlement was originally established as a pustara, a Pannonian type of hamlet.

Education
Branch school of Elementary school Markušica is located in Gaboš. Education at local schools is in Serbian.

Demographic history
According to the 1991 census, the village was inhabited by a majority of Serbs (87.66%), and minority of Croats (7.37%) and Yugoslavs (2.27%).

See also
Markušica Municipality
Church of the Nativity of the Virgin Mary, Gaboš

References

External links
 The church of Gaboš

Populated places in Vukovar-Syrmia County
Populated places in Syrmia
Joint Council of Municipalities
Serb communities in Croatia